John Polson Cameron Corbett, 4th Baron Rowallan (born 8 March 1947), is a British hereditary peer.  He is the son of Arthur Corbett, 3rd Baron Rowallan, and Eleanor Mary Boyle. He is usually known as Johnny Corbett or Johnny Rowallan.

Biography
He was educated at Eton College and the Royal Agricultural College.

He contested Glasgow Garscadden in the October 1974 general election and Kilmarnock in the 1979 general election as a Conservative.

He inherited Rowallan Castle, the family seat, directly from his grandfather, the 2nd Baron Rowallan, in 1977. The 2nd Baron had disinherited his eldest son and heir, Arthur Corbett, John's father. The Hon. Johnny Corbett (as he was styled at the time) was forced to sell Rowallan Castle in 1989. He was declared bankrupt in 1993, the year he succeeded to the peerage. He sat in the House of Lords from 1995 to 1999 when, along with almost all other hereditary peers, he lost his automatic right to a seat with the passage of the House of Lords Act 1999.

He runs the Rowallan Activity Centre, an equestrian centre near Meikle Mosside, Fenwick in Ayrshire, with his third wife, Claire, Baroness Rowallan, and her daughter, Sophie Dinning, a former international showjumper. He was chair of British Showjumping from 1998 to 2011.

Marriages
He married his first wife Susan Jane Diane Green, daughter of James Green, in 1971. Together they had two children: 
 Hon. Jason William Polson Cameron Corbett (born 21 April 1972)
 Hon. Joanna Gwyn Alice Corbett (born 8 June 1974).

He married his second wife Sandrew Filomena Bryson, daughter of William Bryson, in 1984. They had two children together: 
 Hon. Jonathan Arthur Cameron Corbett (born 3 March 1985)
 Hon. Soay Mairi Cameron Corbett (born 16 March 1988).

Lord Rowallan married, thirdly, Claire Dinning Laidler, his present wife, daughter of Robert Laidler, in 1995, without issue.

Arms

References

1947 births
Living people
People educated at Eton College
Alumni of the Royal Agricultural University
Barons in the Peerage of the United Kingdom
Rowallan